Károly Kővári (21 June 1912 – 20 April 1978) was a Hungarian alpine skier who competed in the 1936 Winter Olympics and  in the 1948 Winter Olympics.

References

1912 births
1978 deaths
Hungarian male alpine skiers
Hungarian male Nordic combined skiers
Olympic alpine skiers of Hungary
Olympic Nordic combined skiers of Hungary
Alpine skiers at the 1936 Winter Olympics
Alpine skiers at the 1948 Winter Olympics
Nordic combined skiers at the 1936 Winter Olympics
20th-century Hungarian people